Melanorhopala is a genus of lace bugs in the family Tingidae. There are about five described species in Melanorhopala.

Species
These five species belong to the genus Melanorhopala:
 Melanorhopala balli Drake, 1928
 Melanorhopala clavata (Stål, 1873)
 Melanorhopala froeschneri Henry & Wheeler, 1986
 Melanorhopala infuscat Parshley, 1917
 Melanorhopala infuscata Parshley, 1917

References

Further reading

 
 
 
 

Tingidae
Articles created by Qbugbot